This is a list of the best-selling albums of the 21st century to date based on IFPI certification and Nielsen SoundScan sales tracking. The criteria are that the album must have been published (including self-publishing by the artist), and the album must have shipped at least 10 million units starting from January 1, 2001.
Units sold include physical copies and digital downloads.

From 2022, IFPI reported three formats of sales chart , newly created Global vinyl album chart , combination of physical copies and digital downloads as Global album sales chart and Global all format chart for totaling of all sales.

Legend

30 million copies or more

20–29 million copies

13–19 million copies

10–12 million copies

Best-selling album by year
The charts of the best-selling albums by year in the world are compiled by the International Federation of the Phonographic Industry (IFPI) annually since 2001. These charts are published in their two annual reports, the Digital Music Report and the Recording Industry in Numbers. Both the Digital Music Report and the Recording Industry in Numbers were replaced in 2016 by the Global Music Report.

In 2022, for albums released in 2021, IFPI reported three formats of sales chart , newly created Global vinyl album chart , combination of physical copies and digital downloads as Global album sales chart and Global all format chart for totaling of all sales. Adele's 30 topped all three format charts.

See also 

 List of best-selling albums
 List of best-selling albums in the United States
 List of best-selling albums by country
 List of best-selling music artists
 List of best-selling singles
 List of best-selling albums in the United States of the Nielsen SoundScan era
 List of best-selling albums by year in the United States
 List of best-selling Latin albums in the United States
 IFPI Global Recording Artist of the Year

References 

Best-selling albums
Best-selling albums
21st century